The Sabor line (Linha do Sabor) was a  railway in north-east Portugal. It ran for nearly 106 km between Pocinho and Duas Igrejas, near Miranda do Douro. It closed in 1988.

History

The Sabor line served a very rural part of the country, following the Sabor river for part of its route. Construction of the line was partly intended to promote economic development in one of the most economically disadvantaged parts of Portugal, as well as to serve the iron ore mines at Rebordelo. The line was built by CF de Estado (State Railways), but became part of CP in 1947.

In common with the other narrow gauge railways leading from the Douro Valley, the Sabor line was built with metre gauge tracks. Freight trains were operated by steam for almost the entire history of the line (until the early 1980s), whilst passenger trains were mostly operated by small petrol or diesel railcars. 2-4-6-0T Mallet steam locomotives were used on the line, especially for the heavy iron ore freight trains.

The line ran from Pocinho station, which was a junction with the main  Douro railway line through the Douro Valley to Oporto. The northern terminus of the line was at Duas Igrejas, a tiny settlement several kilometres from the municipal capital of Miranda do Douro. The line opened from Pocinho to Carviçais in 1917, with extensions to Lagoaça in 1927, Mogadouro in 1930 and eventually reaching Duas Igrejas in 1938. The line was never completed as far as Miranda do Douro. Much of the route was located within a few kilometres of the border with Spain.

The major reason for building the line was freight traffic from the iron ore mines at Rebordelo. The iron ore traffic ceased in 1970, effectively making eventual closure inevitable. By the 1970s passenger services were being regularly replaced by buses. Passenger trains ceased in 1981 and the line closed completely in 1988.

Based on the Portuguese Wikipedia website

Other metre gauge railways in the Douro Valley

Corgo line - closed 2009
Tâmega line - closed 2009
Tua line - closed 2008

See also 
List of railway lines in Portugal
List of Portuguese locomotives and railcars
History of rail transport in Portugal
Comboios de Portugal
History of rail transport in Portugal

References

External links
Photographs of the Sabor line on the Flickr website

Metre gauge railways in Portugal
Railway lines in Portugal
1988 disestablishments in Portugal
Railway lines closed in 1988